Padwa is a village in India.

Padwa may also refer to:

People with the surname
Chanoch Dov Padwa (1908–2000), Orthodox Jewish posek and rabbinic leader
Imanuel Permenas Padwa (born 1984), Indonesian footballer
Vladimir Padwa (1900–1981), American pianist, composer, and educator

Other uses
 Gudi Padwa, a Hindu holy day
 Bali Pratipada/Diwali Padwa, A Diwali day and is the 1st day of the new month – Kartik in the Hindu calendar. It marks the start of Hindu financial year